Selkirk Shores State Park is a  state park located in the Town of Richland in Oswego County, New York. The park is located on the eastern shore of Lake Ontario.

Park description
Selkirk Shores State Park features a swimming beach on Lake Ontario, hiking trails, campsites and cabins. The park is associated with the nearby Pine Grove Boat Launch, which provides access for small boats to the lower Salmon River.

A "Bird Conservation Area" at the park protects breeding habitat for several regionally threatened bird species, including pied-billed grebes, American bitterns, least bitterns, and black terns.

See also
 List of New York state parks

References

External links
 New York State Parks: Selkirk Shores State Park
 New York State Parks: Pine Grove Boat Launch

State parks of New York (state)
Parks in Oswego County, New York